Almeron Eager (March 14, 1838 – October 15, 1902) was an American farmer, merchant, and politician.

Born in Sangerfield, New York, Eager moved to Wisconsin, in 1854, and settled on a farm in the town of Union, Rock County, Wisconsin. In 1868, Eager moved to Evansville, Wisconsin. He was also a merchant, tobacco buyer, and was president of the Baker Manufacturing Company. Eager served as town treasurer and then as trustee and president of the village of Evansville, Wisconsin. Eager also served on the Rock County, Wisconsin Board of Supervisors and was a Republican. From 1901 until his death in 1902, Eager served in the Wisconsin State Assembly. Eager died at his home in Evansville, Wisconsin.

References

1838 births
1902 deaths
Businesspeople from Wisconsin
County supervisors in Wisconsin
Farmers from Wisconsin
Mayors of places in Wisconsin
Republican Party members of the Wisconsin State Assembly
People from Oneida County, New York
People from Union, Rock County, Wisconsin
Wisconsin city council members
People from Evansville, Wisconsin
19th-century American politicians